"You Have Placed a Chill in My Heart" is a song by British pop duo Eurythmics. It was written by group members Annie Lennox and David A. Stewart, and appears on the duo's sixth studio album, Savage (1987). It was released as the fourth and final single from the album in the United Kingdom and as the second in the United States. In the first, it was the only single from the album to reach the top 20 on the UK Singles Chart, peaking at number 16 (the duo's 12th overall).

Composition
The track is driven by a drum machine and is a mostly synth-based ballad. Lyrically, Lennox sings of mustering the power to leave a destructive relationship with a lover who does not return the affection she deserves ("...a woman's just too tired to think / about the dirty old dishes in the kitchen sink").

Critical reception
Pan-European magazine Music & Media wrote, "Another spellbinding song from the beautiful Savage LP. Both rocking and contemplative and carrying an inescapeable groove."

Cash Box called it an "arresting, riveting record" and praised Lennox's "powerful, beefy [vocal] performance."

Music video
The song's accompanying music video continued the concept directed by Sophie Muller (seen earlier in the videos for the singles "Beethoven (I Love to Listen To)" and "I Need a Man", and throughout most of the Savage video album).

Track listings

 7-inch: RCA (UK, GER, SPA, AUS, JP)
 "You Have Placed a Chill in My Heart" (LP version) – 3:52
 "You Have Placed a Chill in My Heart" (acoustic version) – 3:20
* acoustic version was recorded at Corbin Hall, 1988

 7-inch: RCA (CAN)
 "You Have Placed a Chill in My Heart" (LP version) – 3:52
 "Wide Eyed Girl" (LP version) – 3:34

 7-inch: RCA (US)
 "You Have Placed a Chill in My Heart" (LP version) – 3:52
 "Wide Eyed Girl" (LP version) – 3:34

* The US promo 7-inch single has the A-side as "Chill Mix" 4:00

 12-inch: RCA (UK, GER)
 "You Have Placed a Chill in My Heart" (dance mix) – 7:52
 "Do You Want to Break Up?" (dance mix) – 6:12
 "You Have Placed a Chill in My Heart" (acoustic version) – 3:20

 12-inch: RCA (US)
 "You Have Placed a Chill in My Heart" (LP version) – 3:52
 "Here Comes the Rain Again" (live version) – 7:36
 "Wide Eyed Girl" (LP version) – 3:34
*live version recorded in Sydney, February 1987

 CD single: RCA (UK)
 "You Have Placed a Chill in My Heart" (LP version) – 3:52
 "Do You Want to Break Up?" (LP version) – 3:40
 "Here Comes the Rain Again" (live version)* – 7:39
 "You Have Placed a Chill in My Heart" (acoustic version) – 3:27
* live version recorded in Sydney, February 1987

Credits and personnel
 Annie Lennox – songwriter
 David A. Stewart – producer, songwriter
 Mastered at Sterling

Charts

References

External links
 Track listings

1987 songs
1988 singles
Eurythmics songs
Music videos directed by Sophie Muller
RCA Records singles
Songs written by David A. Stewart
Songs written by Annie Lennox
Song recordings produced by Dave Stewart (musician and producer)